Mogibacterium pumilum  is a Gram-positive, anaerobic, rod-shaped and non-spore-forming bacterium from the genus of Mogibacterium which has been isolated from the Periodontal pocket of a human.

References 

Eubacteriaceae
Bacteria described in 2000